The Adam Mountains, sometimes called the Adam Range, are a small mountain range in the southeastern extremity of the Alaska Panhandle, in the Ketchikan Gateway Borough near the Halleck Range. It has an area of 50 km2 and is a subrange of the Boundary Ranges which in turn form part of the Coast Mountains.

See also
List of mountain ranges

References

Boundary Ranges
Mountains of Ketchikan Gateway Borough, Alaska
Mountains of Alaska